Haughton Halt was a minor station located north of Shrewsbury on the GWR's Paddington to Birkenhead main line. It was opened in the nineteen thirties as part of the GWR's halt construction programme, aimed at combatting growing competition from bus services and would primarily have served the adjacent (and now disused) Haughton Airfield. Today the route is part of the Shrewsbury to Chester line. Nothing now remains on the site.

Historical services
Express trains did not call at Haughton Halt, only local services. No freight or parcels traffic was handled here.

References

Neighbouring stations

External links
 Haughton Halt on navigable 1946 O.S. map
 Disused Stations: Haughton Halt

Disused railway stations in Shropshire
Former Great Western Railway stations
Railway stations in Great Britain opened in 1934
Railway stations in Great Britain closed in 1960